The 1922–23 Sussex County Football League season was the third in the history of the competition.

League table
The league featured 11 clubs, 9 which competed in the last season, along with two new clubs:
 Eastbourne Old Comrades
 Hove

League table

References

1921-22
9